Vettius fantasos is a species of butterfly belonging to the family Hesperiidae.

It is native to Central America.

References

Hesperiidae